Neotis is a bird genus in the family Otididae. It contains the following species:

References

 
Bird genera
Taxonomy articles created by Polbot